All My Tomorrows is a studio album by American jazz saxophonist Grover Washington Jr. The album was released in 1994 on Columbia Records label. The album is his fifth for Columbia and twenty-fourth overall as a leader; also this is his first all-acoustic record.

Critical reception

Jeff Simon of The Buffalo News gave a 4.5 out of 5 stars rating saying "It's the very quiet and intimacy and unassuming beauty of this record that make it his best in many years -- from the opening bossa nova "E Preciso Perdovar" with guitarist Romero Lubambo to the finale "Estate" with just this disc's basic quartet. Playing with pianist Hank Jones only brings out the fact that a soulful and beautiful sound like Washington's belongs to no jazz era but to all jazz eras simultaneously (that's true no matter which saxophone he picks up). And the brass voicings in the arrangements by Larris Willis and Slide Hampton couldn't be creamier. An exceptional disc." Andrew Hamilton of AllMusic wrote "Washington's Winelight album, one of his best, was laid-back also but Washington's M.O. was stamped all over it; here you need credits and liner notes for verification, and only the opening tune emits any sparks. An attempt to silence the die-hard jazz critics who considered him a lightweight, but a disappointment for his Mister Magic fans".

A reviewer of India Today noted "Basically a rhythm-and-blues saxophonist, Grover Washington Jr is in the groove also on the trombone and trumpet. Of course, the saxophone remains his forte. Listen to "When I fall in love", "For heaven's sake" and "I'm glad there is you" on this album, and you'll be strongly recommending it to all your friends". With a 3 out of 4 stars rating Zan Stewart of the Los Angeles Times proclaimed "This album, while being touted as a “mainstream” session from saxman Washington, is really more high-quality easy-listening jazz, with tempos relaxed and solos reflecting the melodies of songs."

Track listing

Personnel 
 Grover Washington, Jr. – soprano saxophone (1-6, 8, 10, 11), tenor sax soloist (7), alto saxophone (9)
 Hank Jones – acoustic piano 
 Romero Lubambo – guitar (1), arrangements (1)
 George Mraz – bass
 Billy Hart – drums (1, 2, 4, 5, 7, 9, 10, 11)
 Lewis Nash – drums (3, 6, 8)
 Steve Berrios – percussion (1)
 Bobby Watson – alto saxophone (5, 7)
 Jimmy Cozier – baritone saxophone (5, 7)
 Bobby Lavell – tenor saxophone (5, 7)
 Robin Eubanks – trombone (2, 5, 7)
 Eddie Henderson – trumpet (1, 4, 9), flugelhorn (2, 5, 8)
 Earl Gardner – flugelhorn (5), trumpet (7)
 Todd Barkan – arrangements 
 Slide Hampton – arrangements
 Robert Sadin – arrangements
 Larris Willis – arrangements
 Freddy Cole – vocals (3, 8, 10)
 Jeanie Bryson – vocals (10)

Production 
 Grover Washington, Jr. – producer 
 Todd Barkan – producer
 George Butler – executive producer 
 Rudy Van Gelder – recording, mixing, mastering
 Maureen Sickler – assistant engineer
 Paul Silverthorn – production coordinator 
 Christine Washington – production coordinator 
 Allen Weinberg – art direction, design 
 Nana Watanabe – photography

References

1994 albums
Columbia Records albums
Grover Washington Jr. albums